Labūnava (formerly) is a village in Kėdainiai district municipality, in Kaunas County, in central Lithuania. According to the 2011 census, the village had a population of 747 people. The Labūnava Reservoir on the Barupė is located next to the village. There is a kidergarden, a library, a school, a forestry, an agriculture cooperative, a Catholic church of the Divine, a cemetery, some relics of the former manor (two towers, hunter house).

History
During the 14th century, Labūnava was under attacks from the Teutonic Knights. It was mentioned for the first time in 1364, in the chronicle of Hermann von Wartberge. The Labūnava Manor has been known since the 16th century. Labūnava has been burnt during Napoleon's campaign in 1812.

Labūnava developed greatly during the Soviet era. It became a center of the "Eastern Dawn" kolkhoz. This kolkhoz was one of the leading ones in all Lithuanian SSR. Labūnava settlement was awarded at the USSR People's Achievements' Exposition in 1978.

Demography

Notable people
 Etela Karpickienė (born in 1966), economist, the Seimas member (2006–2008).
 Vaclovas Daujotas-Labunauskis, 16th-17th century Samogitian poet.
 Danas Sodaitis (born in 1989), handicapped athlete, European vice-champion.

Images

References

Villages in Kaunas County
Kėdainiai District Municipality